The Kaqchikel language (in modern orthography; formerly also spelled Cakchiquel or Cachiquel) is an indigenous Mesoamerican language and a member of the Quichean–Mamean branch of the Mayan languages family. It is spoken by the indigenous Kaqchikel people in central Guatemala.  It is closely related to the Kʼicheʼ (Quiché) and Tzʼutujil languages.

Kaqchikel is taught in public schools through Guatemala's intercultural bilingual education programs.

History

Before conquest 
Kaqchikel is spoken by the indigenous Maya in Central Guatemala. The Mayan civilization dates back to the Pre-classic period (2000 BC to 300 AD). Geographically, the Maya expanded from Mexico, Belize and Guatemala. This changed between 900 AD and when the Spanish arrived. Their settlement moved west and into the highlands of Guatemala. Archaeological evidence shows suggestions of Kaqchikel living in Iximcheʼ, which today is located near Tecpan, Guatemala.

After conquest 
In 1523, the Spaniards left Mexico and headed towards Guatemala. This crusade was led by Pedro de Alvarado. His first victory was over the Kʼiche, which led him towards the Kaqchikel capital. The Kaqchikel joined forces with de Alvarado, to take over the Tzʼutujiles. Instead, their hopes to become stronger were defeated when de Alvarado turned against them and destroyed their capital, which was a part of the Spanish mass extermination plans of the indigenous. This plan decreased the number of Kaqchikel speakers, as they were required to then speak Spanish.

Present 
Today, the Mayan language of Kaqchikel is being revitalized and several Mayans are using education as a way to restore their language and culture. In 1986 the Academy of the Mayan Languages of Guatemala (ALMG) standardized an alphabet for the Mayan languages, which started a new movement for linguistic conversation.

Literacy 
Literacy rates in Kaqchikel are low. Literacy campaigns are usually conducted in Spanish, and promote Spanish. In fact, most Mayan people are more literate in Spanish than they are in their native tongue. However, this is changing due to the movement to promote Mayan language literacy. Kaqchikel is being taught in public schools such as Guatemala's intercultural bilingual education programs. United States universities also offer programs that give the opportunity to learn Kaqchikel, such as Tulane University and the University of Kansas.

Distribution
The Kaqchikel language is spoken in the following municipalities (Variación Dialectal en Kaqchikel, 2000).

Sololá
Sololá
San Marcos La Laguna
San Lucas Tolimán
San Antonio Palopó
Santa Catarina Palopó
San Andrés Semetabaj
San José Chacayá
Santa Cruz La Laguna

Chimaltenango
Tecpán
Patzún
Patzicía
San José Poaquil
San Martín Jilotepeque
San Andrés Itzapa
San Miguel Pochuta
San Pedro Yepocapa
San Juan Comalapa

Sacatepéquez
San Antonio Aguas Calientes
Santa María de Jesús
Santo Domingo Xenacoj
Santa María Cauqué

Guatemala
San Juan Sacatepéquez
San Pedro Sacatepéquez
San Pedro Chuarrancho

External classification
Kaqchikel is a member of the Mayan language family. Mayan languages fall under the Proto- Mayan language family. This family is broken into four branches: Western, Eastern, Yucatecan, and Huastecan. Kaqchikel falls under the Qichean and Quichean Proper. Quichean Proper breaks down into four new languages: Kaqchikel, Tzʼutujil, Kʼicheʼ, and Achi. Tzʼutujil is the closest dialect to Kaqchikel. Mayan languages are spoken throughout Mexico, Guatemala, Belize, and Honduras. 

In Joseph Greenberg's Amerind hypothesis, Kaqchikel is classified as a member of the Penutian stock, in the Mayan branch of the Mexican family within that stock. However, this hypothesis has been largely discounted by modern linguists.

Greenberg's hypothesis has received significant amounts of negative criticism from many important linguists ever since it was first published in 1987. In Greenberg's etymological dictionary of Amerind, Kaqchikel words are found in 5 entries. Four of the entries are unremarkable; but the fifth uses two words, a-ĉin and iŝ-tan, as examples of a protoword *tʼina / tʼana / tʼuna, meaning "son/child/daughter" despite the fact that a-ĉin was already used in the dictionary to mean "elder". This is an example of a commonly cited flaw in the work, which is that Greenberg reaches too far in search of evidence. In general, the documentation of Kaqchikel in the Amerind etymological dictionary serves to highlight the problems with the hypothesis more than it helps Greenberg's cause.

Phonology
In the charts below, each of the Kaqchikel phonemes is represented by the character or set of characters that denote it in the standard orthography developed by the Guatemalan Academy of Mayan Languages (ALMG) and sanctioned by the Guatemalan government. Where different, the corresponding symbol in the International Phonetic Alphabet appears in brackets. The dialect used in this example is that of Xenacoj.

Vowels
Kaqchikel dialects differ somewhat in their vowel inventories. Each dialect has a set of five tense vowels and either one, two, four, or five lax vowels. The chart below shows all the possible vowels that can occur in dialects of Kaqchikel. Although the dialect of Sololá uses the maximal ten-vowel system with all the vowels except schwa , the dialects of San Juan Sacatepéquez and San Andrés Semetabaj only use the five tense vowels and schwa.

There is a variance in the pronunciation of the lax vowels across the dialects. Some dialects lower the given vowel, others center the vowel but do not lower it. The Xenacoj dialect used here both centers and lowers the vowels with a tendency to more strongly lower close vowels and more strongly center back vowels.

The pronunciation of the vowels spelt with o and u varies between [ɤ] and [o] for ⟨o⟩, and [ɯ] and [u] for ⟨u⟩. This roundness ambiguity for the back vowel phonemes is a trait found in many Mayan languages, such as Tzotzil and Mam. These vowel sounds may be pronounced as either rounded or unrounded depending on the speakers preference, and both are considered native-like.

The vowel sound represented by the letter ⟨ü⟩ has a pronunciation between the [ʉ] and [ʊ] sounds. It is farther back and lower than the prototypical [ʉ] but it is not as low or back as [ʊ].
The vowel sound represented by the letter ⟨ö⟩ has similar traits. It is typically pronounced as either a lower [ɵ], though not as low as [ɘ] but may also be pronounced as [ɔ]. It may fall anywhere between those sounds, but only lowered [ɵ] and centered [ɔ] are considered native-like.

Consonants
Like other Mayan languages, Kaqchikel does not distinguish voiced and voiceless stops and affricates, instead distinguishing plain and glottalized stops and affricates. The plain stops and affricates are usually voiceless and are aspirated at the ends of words and unaspirated elsewhere. The glottalized stops and affricates are usually ejective in the case of tʼ, kʼ, chʼ, and tzʼ and implosive in the case of bʼ and qʼ.

Allophones and phonological processes
Several of the consonants in Kaqchikel have variant forms that occur give their position within a word.
The plain stops  are aspirated internally before the prefix -bʼäl and in word-final position.
Examples:
 viewpoint is realized as 
 knapsack is realized as 
 dad is realized as 
 squirrel is realized as 
In the same position, the ejective  palatalizes to become .
Examples:
 horse is realized as 
 sweet is realized as 
 stingy is realized as 
 straw is realized as 
The voiceless uvular stop has an affricated release in final position. It is realized as the affricate  in this position only, and is not contrastive.
Examples:
 bone realized as 
 person realized as 
The glottal stop  plays an important role in Kaqchikel; since words may not begin with a vowel and diphthongs do not exist in the language, this consonant often serves to separate vowels, and is found at the beginning of words that would otherwise begin with a vowel. It can also occur syllable- and word-finally.
Examples:
 your hand is realized as 
 yesterday is realized as 
The implosive consonants in Kaqchikel are usually voiceless, which is unusual for implosives.
The voiceless bilabial  has a tendency to be fricatized to  word finally, before  and when in consonant clusters. In many dialects /ɸ/ has become the standard pronunciation in all situations while in others it has become /f/.
The voiceless bilabial ejective  is an allophone of the bilabial implosive ; there is free variation between the two in word-final position. Elsewhere, only  is found.
The uvular implosive  and its allophone, the voiceless uvular ejective , also experience free variation in word-final position.
The distribution of the phoneme represented by the letter w is quite varied across Kaqchikel dialects. It has a total of seven allophones: . The labiovelar approximant  is the historical standard pronunciation, and this spelling has been maintained in order to have a single standard for all the various dialects of Kaqchikel. There is too much variation to list here, but these are some generalizations:
Examples:
At the end of a word, the  phoneme can be realized in one of four ways:  can be found in all environments, and  can occur after , depending on the dialect.
Examples:

Syllable structure
Only a certain number of syllable types occur in Kaqchikel. The most common syllable types are CV (consonant-vowel) and CVC (consonant-vowel-consonant). V (vowel only) or VC (vowel-consonant) syllables are not allowed phonetically; a syllable that is conceived of as beginning with a vowel will begin in pronunciation with a glottal stop, although this is not always reflected in standard orthography or in the phonological realization of a word. While two CVC syllables often occur next to each other in the same word, consonant clusters in a single syllable are relatively uncommon. When these do occur, they are normally at the beginnings or ends of words and consist of either two continuants, a sonorant and a stop, or a fricative and a stop, with the stop always to the inside of its partner.

Morphology and syntax
Kaqchikel is a moderately synthetic language with fusional affixes. It has a strong system of affixation, including both suffixes and prefixes. These attach to both nouns and verbs; prefixes are exclusively inflective, whereas suffixes can be inflective or derivational. Inflective prefixes are quite short, often composed of a single sound and never consisting of more than three; suffixes can be longer than this. Because of the synthetic-fusional nature of Kaqchikel, it is difficult to discuss the language's morphology and syntax as two separate entities; they are very robustly intertwined.

Word classes
Kaqchikel has 6 major word classes and several minor classes, referred to collectively as "particles." The major word classes are groups of bases or roots that can take affixes. These classes are nouns, adjectives, adverbs, intransitive verbs, transitive verbs, and positionals. Positionals in this language are a group of roots which cannot function as words on their own; in combination with affixes they are used to describe relationships of position and location. In English, these words would fall into other categories, namely adjectives, adverbs, and verbs, both transitive and intransitive.

The minor classes or particles are words that do not take affixes; they mostly function in adverbial roles, and include such things as interrogative particles, affirmative/negative words, markers of time and location, conjunctions, prepositions and demonstratives. In addition to these officially recognized classes, there are a few other groups of words which do not fall neatly into any of the above categories. These groups are articles, pronouns, numbers, affectives, and words used for measurement. All of these types of words function differently in Kaqchikel, and so they are considered to belong to different word classes.

Agreement
Kaqchikel shows agreement with the subject and object of a verb.  Nouns also show agreement with their possessors.  The agreement pattern of Kaqchikel follows an ergative-absolutive pattern. This affects both nouns and verbs. The functions of the ergative agreement include marking not only subjects of transitive verbs, but also possessors of nouns. There are two main sets of allomorphs for the ergative agreement markers, which are prefixed to the noun or verb they modify. One set is used before roots beginning in a consonant, and the other before those beginning with a vowel. These forms below are found when the ergative marks the possessor of nouns.

When the ergative forms are being used to denote the subject of a transitive verb, some of the forms differ. Before consonants, first person singular nu- becomes in- and third person singular ru- becomes u-. Before vowels, first person singular w- becomes inw-, third person singular u- becomes ur-, first person plural qa- becomes w-, and third person plural ki- becomes kiw-.

The third person singular of the ergative is variable in its phonology, and the initial /r/ is often omitted, with variability among the different dialects of Kaqchikel. Absolutive agreement has three functions: its marks the subject of an intransitive verb, the subject of a non-verbal predicate, and the object of a transitive verb. Unlike ergative agreement, it has only one set of forms, which are used before both consonants and vowels.

Note that the third person singular is unmarked. In some dialects, an epenthetic vowel is inserted between a marker of the incompletive or potential states and the base, in the space which would be occupied by the absolutive prefix. However, this is not an allophone of the absolutive third person singular marker, but rather a phonetic addition which is not related to the case marking system.

Also, it is important to note that marking of subjects and objects occurs only on the verb, not on any nouns which may fill those roles as constituents. Agreement can take the place of pronouns, thus the language has pro-drop.

Word order
Kaqchikel has a word order in which the head of a phrase usually comes before any other element of the phrase.  The following sentences show examples of the order of sentences, determiner phrases (DP), noun phrases (NP), prepositional phrases (PP), and quantifier phrases (QP):

Sentences show considerable variability in their word order.  The syntactic function of words is determined not only by their position at the beginning, middle or end of a sentence, but also by their definiteness, level of animation and potency, and a logical analysis of what role each word can play in the sentence. (For example, the verb to throw with the nouns child and stone can only have one logical ordering, regardless of the position of the nouns with respect to the verb. For this reason, an inanimate constituent cannot be the subject if the other constituent is animate.). Due to these conditions, Kaqchikel word order is relatively free and various orderings can be seen without there being any confusion or lack of understanding.

Possible word orders that can occur in Kaqchikel are verb-first orders (VSO, VOS) and subject-first orders (SVO, SOV). (V: verb, S: subject, O: object)
Verb-first orders (VSO, VOS).  When the verb occurs first and only one constituent is definite, then that constituent functions as the subject.  If both constituents are definite, then the one closest to the verb (the first constituent) is the subject; if both constituents are indefinite, then the subject is the latter of the two.
Subject-first orders (SVO, SOV). The subject can come first only if it is animate and the object is not. In this case, the definiteness of the two constituents does not matter; that is to say, the subject can be either definite or indefinite, so long as it is animate and occurs first. The order of the verb and object is unimportant.

Other constituents of a sentence, such as dative, comitative, agentive, and adverbial phrases, tend to come first in the sentence. However, they can also come after the nucleus of the sentence, the predicate.

Reduplication
Kaqchikel uses reduplication as an intensifier. This form is not a single word but two separate words which, when combined, intensify the meaning of the base word, the same way "very" does in English.

Vocabulary

Numbers
 jun
 kaʼiʼ
 oxiʼ
 kajiʼ
 woʼoʼ
 waqiʼ
 wuquʼ
 waqxaqiʼ
 bʼelejeʼ
 lajuj
 julajuj
 kabʼlajuj
 oxlajuj
 kajlajuj
 wolajuj
 waqlajuj
 wuqlajuj
 waqxaqlajuj
 bʼelejlajuj
 jukʼal

Common words
winaq, person
achin, man
ixöq, woman
ixim, corn
kotzʼiʼj, flower
qʼïj, sun/day
akʼwal, child
teʼej, mother
tataʼaj, father
wäy, tortilla
mes, cat
tzʼi, dog
ulew, earth/land
chʼumil, star
juyu, mountain
che''', treeik, moon/monthtlinche, marimbaya', waterjay, house

Notes

References
 

Dictionaries, grammars, and translations in Kaqchikel (Cakchiquel)

Further reading
 "The Semantic Value of the -aʼ and the -iʼ Noun Plurals in Cakchiquel," by Larry L. Richman in Notes on Linguistics'', Summer Institute of Linguistics, vol. 13, January 1980

External links 

 University of Kansas Kaqchikel Mayan Resource Center

Agglutinative languages
Mayan languages
Indigenous languages of Central America
Mesoamerican languages
Languages of Guatemala
Kaqchikel
Chimaltenango Department
Guatemala Department
Sacatepéquez Department
Sololá Department